Christian Eggen (born 8 January 1957) is a Norwegian composer, pianist and conductor.

References

1957 births
Living people
Norwegian classical composers
Norwegian classical pianists
Norwegian conductors (music)
Male conductors (music)
Norwegian male classical composers
Norwegian male pianists
21st-century conductors (music)
21st-century classical pianists
21st-century Norwegian male musicians